Little Jost Van Dyke (colloquially, "Little Jost") is one of the British Virgin Islands.  It is a small island on the east end of the island of Jost Van Dyke.  Like Jost Van Dyke, it takes its name from the Dutch privateer Joost van Dyk.  It is the location of the Diamond Cay National Park, which includes the nesting grounds of wild boobies, terns and pelicans.

Sights
Dive sites can be found at Twin Towers, two large rock formations rising from 90 feet.

There is a small bar and restaurant called B-Line Beach Bar on the south side of the island. The bar can be reached by docking at a crumbling cement pier that was constructed for a failed fuel depot project. The operators of the bar are the island's only inhabitants.

Fauna and flora
Eagle rays and tarpon are found here.

Natives
The island has no major settlement today, but was the site of an eighteenth-century Quaker colony.  

John C. Lettsome (1744—1815), founder of the Medical Society of London, was born on the island.

References

Uninhabited islands of the British Virgin Islands